The 1943 Cornell Big Red football team was an American football team that represented Cornell University as an independent during the 1943 college football season. In its eighth season under head coach Carl Snavely, the team compiled a 6–4 record and outscored opponents 158–138. The team captain was Meredith "Bud" Cushing.

Cornell played its home games at Schoellkopf Field in Ithaca, New York.

Schedule

References

Cornell
Cornell Big Red football seasons
Cornell Big Red football